Uwe Rahn (born 21 May 1962) is a German former professional footballer who played as an attacking midfielder.

Career
Rahn played 318 Bundesliga matches in his professional career, scoring the majority of his 107 Bundesliga goals in his eight years at Borussia Mönchengladbach where he grew to a West Germany international and lifted the kicker-Torjägerkanone award for scoring the most goals in the Bundesliga of 1986–87. The attacking midfielder scored 24 goals that season, fourteen in the course of the final nine weeks of the season. Subsequent to this achievement, Rahn was awarded Footballer of the Year (Germany) in 1987. Shortly after, he was poised to join PSV Eindhoven as a replacement for Ruud Gullit, but a move stalled and did not take place. Less impressive in scoring the season after, Rahn's form decreased massively then and ended in pittance-like transfers to 1. FC Köln, Hertha BSC, Fortuna Düsseldorf, Eintracht Frankfurt and finally Urawa Red Diamonds of Japan, the club where he finished his career. All the way through those clubs and years he couldn't get his form (and career) back on, something signified by the decreasing length of his spells.

Rahn, who was from time to time used as striker, appeared in a total of 14 matches for West Germany in between 1984 and 1987. In those games he scored five goals, the most important of them seconds after coming on as a second-half substitute for Felix Magath on his debut against Sweden in a World Cup qualifier on 17 October 1984. Hampered by injury, he was part of the 1986 FIFA World Cup squad of his nation but did not come to action in the tournament. Rahn also competed for West Germany at the 1984 Summer Olympics.

Rahn is not related to Helmut Rahn, the 1954 FIFA World Cup-winning goalscorer of West Germany.

Career statistics

Club

International

Honours
Borussia Mönchengladbach
 DFB-Pokal runner-up: 1983–84

1. FC Köln
 Bundesliga runner-up: 1988–89, 1989–90

West Germany
 FIFA World Cup runner-up: 1986

Individual
 Footballer of the Year (Germany): 1987
 Bundesliga top scorer: 1986–87
kicker Bundesliga Team of the Season: 1986–87

References

External links 
 
 
 
 

1962 births
Living people
Footballers from Mannheim
German footballers
Association football midfielders
Germany under-21 international footballers
Germany international footballers
Kicker-Torjägerkanone Award winners
Bundesliga players
J1 League players
Borussia Mönchengladbach players
1. FC Köln players
Hertha BSC players
Urawa Red Diamonds players
Eintracht Frankfurt players
Fortuna Düsseldorf players
1986 FIFA World Cup players
Olympic footballers of West Germany
West German footballers
Footballers at the 1984 Summer Olympics
German expatriate footballers
German expatriate sportspeople in Japan
Expatriate footballers in Japan